Haidilao International Holding Ltd., operating as Haidilao, is a chain of hot pot restaurants founded in Jianyang, Sichuan, China in 1994. Its restaurants typically operate under the name Haidilao Hot Pot. It is the largest hotpot chain in China and has expanded overseas. As of 2022, Haidilao had around 1,300 restaurants in mainland China, Hong Kong, and Taiwan, with its overseas unit, Super Hi International, running 97 outlets around the world, including in Singapore, the UK, and the United States. Their annual revenue is estimated to be more than CN¥10 billion.

Etymology 
In Mandarin, haidilao can be translated as deep-sea fishing, or literally "scooping the bottom of the ocean." The origin of this term comes from a Chinese idiom, hǎidǐlāoyuè (海底捞月, lit. "fishing for the moon"), a metaphor for a hopeless endeavor. This idiom was originally derived from the Chinese Taoist poem Song of Enlightenment (永嘉证道歌). The term haidilao is also used by mahjong players to refer to a rare and lucky situation when a player wins with the last tile.

History 
In March 1994, Zhang Long opened the first Haidilao hot pot restaurant along with three other founders with 8,000 Yuan in Jianyang, Sichuan Province. Haidilao grew competitively with an emphasis on customer service. After five years, Haidilao started to expand beyond Sichuan to other provinces like Xi'an, Shanxi province, and other parts of the world.

In 2018, Haidilao Hot Pot served more than 160 million customers, with an average daily table turnover rate (i.e. the number of parties hosted per table per day) of 5.0. Haidilao Hot Pot has more than 36 million VIP members and 60,000+ staff.

Haidilao and Panasonic jointly launched a "smart" restaurant in 2018. This smart restaurant relies on Panasonic's robotics and image recognition technology to achieve full automation of the kitchen. After the customer orders the food with tablet computer (iPad), the system in the kitchen can automatically recognize the dishes and puts them into the tray.

In 2019, Haidilao opened the first robot-aided hotpot restaurant in Beijing.

In response to the COVID-19 pandemic, Haidilao closed all stores in mainland China on January 26, 2020, to decrease the spread of the virus. On March 12, 2020, with cases decreasing in China, Haidilao began reopening stores.

However, even after reopening, business was slow: patrons chose other options like takeaway over the communal hot pot dining experience. Haidilao also faced backlash for increasing prices to offset pandemic losses, and the amount of people restaurants could serve was limited by government pandemic restrictions.

In 2021, as part of an expansion plan, Haidilao opened 421 new restaurants, but it also closed 276 in an effort to improve the operations and profitability of existing stores.

In 2022, in the wake of China's zero-COVID policy, Haidilao's shares fell more than 60%. Haidilao is focusing on expanding its international presence, spinning off its overseas unit, Super Hi International.

Global expansion 

Haidilao has more than 180 chains globally, more than 20,000 staff, and an annual turnover of 5 billion RMB (almost US$0.77 billion).

By the end of June 30, 2020, Haidilao Hot Pot had 935 stores in operation. In addition to the many locations in China, the company serves the areas of Hong Kong, Malaysia, Singapore, Australia, Taiwan, United Kingdom, Canada, United States, Thailand, Indonesia, Vietnam, South Korea, and Japan.

The company opened its first restaurant outside of mainland China in Clarke Quay, Singapore, in 2012. This was followed by its first US outlet, which opened in Westfield Santa Anita (California) in September 2013. Haidilao continued to develop its network abroad, entering the South Korean market in 2014, the Taiwanese and Japanese markets in 2015, and the Hong Kong market in 2017.

IPO 
In 2008, Haidilao planned to increase $600 million to $700 million in the Hong Kong IPO which could increase the popularity in the global market.

In 2017, Haidilao's net profit rose 22% to 1.19 billion yuan, and revenue increased 36% to 10.64 billion yuan.

In 2018, Haidilao raised nearly US$1 billion in a Hong Kong initial public offering (IPO). The IPO figures show that even though Haidilao faced some safety issues over the past two years, investors are still feeling positive of Haidilao growth in the future.

Founded as a privately held company, Haidilao International Holding Ltd. filed to launch an initial public offering (IPO) in Hong Kong in 2018, aiming to raise up to US$700 million for further expansion.

As of 2018, Haidilao's IPO price of 17.80 Hong Kong dollars a share makes its market capitalization $12 billion.

Operations 
Haidilao enforces strict rules when selecting food suppliers. There are more than 20 dipping sauces on Haidilao's self-service condiment table. Side dishes like peanuts, cucumbers, and fresh food are always provided. Customers can select up to four different soup bases in one pot.

Some Haidilao restaurants have automated kitchens with robot chefs to increase efficiency. Some Haidilao restaurants have robots for food delivery.

In 2013, Haidilao developed a new new videoconference service where customers could see each other by using video conference facilities and remotely videoconference with customers at other Haidilao restaurants.

"Hi to send" service 
Haidilao created the “Hi to send” delivery service in 2003. Once a customer orders food to be delivered, staff will send an electromagnetic pan, an induction cooker, and a wiring board to customers’ home, where they will also help the customers divide their food. They wait outside until customers finish their food, after which they will take away the kitchenware. Since 2013, Haidilao is open for 24 hours a day and offers service of delivery food.

In-person dining 
Every Haidilao restaurant has a waiting room for customers, some of which offer additional services such as nail salon or children's play areas. Additional free before-meal services and amenities include a car wash, fruits, snacks, drinks, and board games.

During the meal, staff offer diners aprons and mobile phone bags, and provide small hairpins for long-haired customers. If customers are celebrating a birthday party or wedding ceremony at Haidilao, they get a special gift. While dining, the restaurant puts on face-changing and hand-pulled noodles performances.

Customers are given snacks, fruit, mints, and toothpicks after their meal.

Controversies

Kitchen hygiene 
On August 25, 2017, kitchen hygiene problems were reported from the Legal Evening News in the restaurants of Beijing Jinsong and Taiyanggong. A video of a rat lying on a sink was uploaded to Weibo, a Chinese social media platform. After three and a half hours, Haidilao posted an apology letter about the hygiene issues. 

Haidilao indicated that all stores needed to have a “bright kitchen”, meaning that the kitchen is now visible to all customers thanks to the installment of transparent glass and opening up of the space.

The Beijing Municipal Food and Drug Administration had two meetings with the representatives of this Haidilao's hygiene problem and required Haidilao to make rectification to their cleanliness, resulting in the requirement that all stores in Beijing would need to be inspected within one month.

In 2022, The Food Standards Agency gave the hygiene rating of "0 - Urgent Improvement necessary" to the chain in Birmingham UK.

Price hikes 
On March 12, 2020, Haidilao reopened many stores after the COVID-19 situation in mainland China improved. However, customers were shocked by the price hikes; some even stated online that they would not go back to Haidilao again. After customer complaints, a Haidilao representative stated that price increases would be limited to 6%, with each restaurant being able to define their own prices.

Porn video exposure crisis 
On the afternoon of January 5, 2019, a Haidilao restaurant located in Wuhan Great Ocean mall suddenly played a pornographic video on the restaurants’ TV screen. One customer shared an image of the video on Weibo, where it was retweeted more than 240 million times. Staff immediately turned off the screen after noticing the video. On January 6, Haidilao posted an official apology on Weibo.

Awards and certifications 

Haidilao Hot Pot has won more than ten titles and honors such as “Advanced Enterprise”, “Consumer satisfaction unit” and “Famous Hot Pot” in Sichuan, Shanxi, Henan and other provinces in China. From 2008 to 2012, it won the title of “Top 10 Hot Pot Restaurants” by the public comment website for 5 consecutive years in China. At the same time, it won the honorary title of “Top 100 Chinese Catering Enterprises” for 5 consecutive years. Haidilao became a successful business case of Harvard Business School in 2009. On May 27, 2011, “Haidilao” was awarded “China Famous Brand”. From 2007 to 2018, the hot pot restaurant won the "China Top 100 Catering Companies" for 12 consecutive years. Haidilao won the “Best Hot Pot”, “Outstanding Service,” or “Outstanding Chinese Restaurant of the Year.” prizes in magazines such as Time out and Beijinger in 2018.

See also 

 List of Chinese restaurants
 Chinese restaurant
 Sichuan cuisine
 Hot pot

References

Further reading

External links 
 
Chinese Haidilao official website

Restaurant chains in China
2018 initial public offerings
Chinese companies established in 1994
Restaurants established in 1994
Companies listed on the Hong Kong Stock Exchange
Companies based in Sichuan
Sichuan cuisine